Temidayo Enitan Adeyehun (born 1 May 1984), also known as Starboy Temidayo, is a Nigerian actor, movie producer and accountant.

Background and education 
Enitan is from Ondo State. He was born in Lagos State. He has a degree in Accounting from Olabisi Onabanjo University. He has a postgraduate certificate in project management from Humber College, Toronto.

Career 
Enitan is a movie promoter and producer. He features mostly in Nollywood movies in Yoruba language. He moved to Canada in the late 2010s and has been shooting Nigerian nollywood in Canada. He promotes Nollywood movies in Canada, organizing shows and summits, and have had Nigerian celebrities like Toyin Abraham, late Rachel Oniga, Bolanle Ninalowo, Iyabo Ojo, Yewande Adekoya, Small Doctor and Biola Adebayo in attendance. He is the CEO of Starboard Entertainment. He is the organizer of the Nigerian Canadian Celebrities Entertainment Awards, and is the executive president of the Canadian chapter of the Theatre Arts and Motion Pictures Practitioners Association of Nigeria (TAPMAN). He is also the organizer of the Nollywood All-Stars Night and the Nigerian Canadian Celebrities Entertainment Award (NICCEA AWARD).

He is has featured in several Yoruba language movies including Owo Adebayo, Ore Mi (My friend), Ayo Olopon, Adegoroye, Ipebi, Dokita Oru and Ikoja Aye. He has had to played unconventional roles in movies, including role as a woman and another where he played the role as each character of a set of twins.

He is also a brand influencer in Canada. He is an ambassador to Quick Collect Canada, Golden Cheetah Logistics Canada, Poundo Potato Canada (FastBear Foods), Homes By Banji, Kenny's Bread Canada, Miiqua Water Canada and Syllabus Autos Canada.

Awards 

1. City People Entertainment Awards (Best New Actor of the Year)

2. African Icon Awards (Entertainment Icon of the Year)

3. Esteem Nigeria youth award (Movie actor/Producer of the Year)

4. Afro Heritage International Award Canada (Community Award of Excellence)

5. CoolWealth Award (Nollywood New Act Diaspora)

6. Esteem Nigeria Youth Award (Nollywood New act Diaspora)

7. Yourba Movie Gist Award (Best Yoruba Movie Actor in Diaspora)

8. Abedorc Productions Award Canada (Award of Excellence)

9. Emperor Nollywood Award (Next Generation Actor)

10. Nigerian Canadian Celebrity Entertainment Awards (Award of Excellent)

11. Elite Vibes Awards

Filmography

Personal life 
He is a cousin to Bolaji Amusan. He is based in Canada. He welcomed a son with his wife in November 2022.

References 

Living people
Nigerian businesspeople
Olabisi Onabanjo University alumni
Yoruba people
1982 births
People from Ondo State